Joel Fameyeh (born 14 May 1997) is a Ghanaian professional footballer. He plays in Russia for FC Rubin Kazan.

Club career
From 2016 till 2019 Fameyeh played in Belarus for Belshina Bobruisk and Dinamo Brest on loan from Ghanaian Wa All Stars.

On 12 July 2019, he signed with Russian Premier League club FC Orenburg. On 10 August 2019, with Orenburg down 0–2 to FC Tambov at home in a league game, Fameyeh came on as a substitute in the 70th minute and scored twice in the next 8 minutes to establish the game's final score of 2–2.

On 2 June 2022, Fameyeh signed a three-year contract with FC Rubin Kazan.

International career

International goals
Scores and results list Ghana's goal tally first.

Honours 

Dynamo Brest
 Belarusian Cup (2): 2017, 2018
 Belarusian Super Cup (2): 2018, 2019

References

External links 
 
 

1997 births
Living people
Footballers from Kumasi
Ghanaian footballers
Association football forwards
Ghana international footballers
Legon Cities FC players
FC Belshina Bobruisk players
FC Dynamo Brest players
FC Orenburg players
FC Rubin Kazan players
Belarusian Premier League players
Russian Premier League players
Russian First League players
Ghanaian expatriate footballers
Expatriate footballers in Belarus
Ghanaian expatriate sportspeople in Belarus
Expatriate footballers in Russia
Ghanaian expatriate sportspeople in Russia